In enzymology, a phosphatidylcholine---dolichol O-acyltransferase is an enzyme that catalyzes the chemical reaction

3-sn-phosphatidylcholine + dolichol  1-acyl-sn-glycero-3-phosphocholine + acyldolichol

Thus, the two substrates of this enzyme are 3-sn-phosphatidylcholine and dolichol, whereas its two products are 1-acyl-sn-glycero-3-phosphocholine and acyldolichol.

This enzyme belongs to the family of transferases, specifically those acyltransferases transferring groups other than aminoacyl groups.  The systematic name of this enzyme class is 3-sn-phosphatidylcholine:dolichol O-acyltransferase.

References

 
 

EC 2.3.1
Enzymes of unknown structure